Falconidae is a family of diurnal birds of prey and includes caracaras, laughing falcon, forest falcons, falconets, pygmy falcons, falcons and kestrels. They have strongly hooked bills, sharply curved talons and excellent eyesight. The plumage is usually composed of browns, whites, chestnut, black and grey, often with barring of patterning. There is little difference in the plumage of males and females, although a few species have some sexual dimorphism in boldness of plumage. They differ from other Falconiformes in killing with their beaks instead of their talons. They have a "tooth" on the side of their beak for the purpose.

They are classified in eleven genera and 67 species of which two are extinct.

Conventions

Conservation statuses listed for each species follow the International Union for Conservation of Nature (IUCN) Red List of Threatened Species. The  symbol indicates that the species's population trend is positive, the  symbol indicates that the species's population trend is negative, the  symbol indicates that the species's population is stable, and the  symbol indicates that the species's population trend is unknown.  Population trends are based on the Red List of Threatened Species. The super-scripted "IUCN" tag is a link to that species's Red List of Threatened Species page. If a species has taxonomic synonyms, a list of these is provided in the "Scientific name" column, underneath the binomial name and author. If a species has subspecies, a list of these is provided in the "Common name" column, underneath the common name.

Classification
Family: Falconidae
 Subfamily Polyborinae
 Genus Daptrius – black caracara
 Genus Ibycter – red-throated caracara (sometimes included in Daptrius)
 Genus Phalcoboenus (4 species) – Andean and southern South American caracaras
 Genus Caracara – crested caracaras (2 living species, 1 extinct)
 Genus Milvago – brown caracaras (2 species)
 Genus Micrastur – forest falcons (7 species)
 Subfamily Falconinae
 Genus Herpetotheres – laughing falcon
 Genus Spiziapteryx – spot-winged falconet
 Genus Polihierax – pygmy falcons (2 species, includes Neohierax)
 Genus Microhierax – typical falconets (5 species)
 Genus Falco – true falcons, hobbies and kestrels (around 37 species)

Following list of Falconidae is based on International Ornithological Congress' World Bird List.

Subfamily Polyborinae
Traditionally, subfamily Polyborinae comprises caracaras and forest falcons which are principally birds of South and Central America. They are classified in six genera and 18 species of which one is extinct since 1906. Unlike the Falco falcons in the same family, caracaras in the five relevant genera are not fast-flying aerial hunters, but are comparatively slow and are often scavengers (a notable exception being the red-throated caracara).

Genus Daptrius

Genus Ibycter

Genus Phalcoboenus

Genus Caracara

Genus Milvago

Genus Micrastur 
Forest falcons are endemic to the Americas. They are classified as 7 species in one genus. They are adapted for agility in thick cover rather than outright speed in the open air. They have short wings, long tails, and extraordinarily acute hearing. While generally visually inconspicuous, their songs are commonly heard.

Subfamily Falconinae

Genus Herpethotheres

Genus Spiziapteryx

Genus Polihierax

Genus Microhierax

Genus Falco 
Falcons are roughly divisible into three or four groups. The first contains the kestrels (probably excepting the American kestrel); the second group contains slightly larger (on average) and more elegant species, the hobbies and relatives. Third are the peregrine falcon and its relatives: variably sized powerful birds which also have a black malar area (except some very light color morphs), and often a black cap also. Very similar to these and sometimes included therein are the four or so species of hierofalcons (literally, "hawk-falcons").

Notes

References

Bibliography

Lists of birds